Oborná (until 1947 Špilendorf) is a municipality and village in Bruntál District in the Moravian-Silesian Region of the Czech Republic. It has about 400 inhabitants.

History
The first written mention of Oborná is from 1405.

According to the Austrian census of 1910, the village had 511 inhabitants, all of them were German-speaking. The most-populous religious group were Roman Catholics with 505 (98.8%).

Gallery

References

External links

Villages in Bruntál District